Barabinsky District is an administrative and municipal district (raion), one of the thirty in Novosibirsk Oblast, Russia. Its administrative center is the town of Barabinsk (which is not administratively a part of the district). Population: 14,169 (2010 Census);

Geography 
The district is located in the western central part of the oblast. Lakes Chany, Sartlan and Tandovo lie in the district.

Administrative and municipal status
Within the framework of administrative divisions, Barabinsky District is one of the thirty in the oblast. The town of Barabinsk serves as its administrative center, despite being incorporated separately as an administrative unit with the status equal to that of the districts.

As a municipal division, the district is incorporated as Barabinsky Municipal District, with the Town of Barabinsk being incorporated within it as Barabinsk Urban Settlement.

References

Notes

Sources

Districts of Novosibirsk Oblast
